The 3rd Youth in Film Awards ceremony (now known as the Young Artist Awards), presented by the Youth in Film Association, honored outstanding youth performers in the fields of film, television and music for the 1980-1981 season, and took place in December 1981 in Hollywood, California.

Established in 1978 by long-standing Hollywood Foreign Press Association member, Maureen Dragone, the Youth in Film Association was the first organization to establish an awards ceremony specifically set to recognize and award the contributions of performers under the age of 18 in the fields of film, television, theater and music.

Although the Youth in Film Awards were conceived as a way to primarily recognize youth performers under the age of 21, the eldest winner in a competitive category at the 3rd annual ceremony was Lionel Richie who was 32 years old on the night he won as "Best Young Musical Recording Artist - Male" for his song "Endless Love" from the soundtrack for the motion picture Endless Love.

The 3rd annual ceremony also marked the first and only time in the history of the Youth in Film Awards that a fictional character would be nominated in a competitive category, with "Little Miss Piggy" winning as "Best Young Musical Recording Artist - Female" for her song "The First Time It Happens" from the soundtrack for the motion picture The Great Muppet Caper.

Categories
★ Bold indicates the winner in each category.

Best Young Performer in a Feature Film

Best Young Motion Picture Actor
★ Ricky Schroder - The Earthling - Filmways
Martin Hewitt - Endless Love - Columbia
Otto Rechenberg - Amy - Disney
Paul Schoeman - Child's Play - AFI
Gabriel Swann - Why Would I Lie? - M.G.M.
Henry Thomas - Raggedy Man - Universal

Best Young Motion Picture Actress
★ Kristy McNichol - Only When I Laugh - Columbia
Melissa Sue Anderson - Happy Birthday to Me - Columbia
Shelby Balik - The Incredible Shrinking Woman - Universal
Mara Hobel - Mommie Dearest - Paramount
Kyle Richards - The Watcher in the Woods - Disney
Brooke Shields - Endless Love - Columbia

Best Young Performer in a Television Special

Best Young Actor in a Television Special
★ Scott Baio - Stoned - ABC
Adam Gunn - Fallen Angel - CBS
Lance Kerwin - Circus Picture
Ralph Macchio - Eight is Enough - ABC
Doug McKeon - The Comeback Kid - ABC
Shane Sinutko - CBS Afternoon Playhouse: I Think I'm Having a Baby - CBS

Best Young Actress in a Television Special
★ Dana Hill - Fallen Angel - CBS
Tonya Crowe - Dark Night of the Scarecrow - CBS
Melissa Gilbert - Splendor in the Grass - NBC
Dana Plato - A Step in Time - KCET
Melissa Michaelsen - Broken Promises - CBS
Lisa Whelchel - Twirl - NBC

Best Young Performer in a Television Series

Best Young Actor in a Television Series
★ Timothy Gibbs - Father Murphy - NBC
Scott Baio - Happy Days - ABC
Philip McKeon - Alice - ABC
Glenn Scarpelli - One Day at a Time - CBS

Best Young Actress in a Television Series
★ Danielle Brisebois - Archie Bunker's Place - CBS 
Olivia Barash - Little House on the Prairie ("Sylvia" segment) - NBC
Missy Francis - Little House on the Prairie - NBC
Dana Hill - The Two of Us - CBS
Katy Kurtzman - Dynasty - ABC
Jill Whelan - The Love Boat - ABC

Best Young Actor in a Daytime Series
★ Michael Damian - The Young and the Restless - CBS
Dick Billingsley - Days of Our Lives - NBC
Marc Bentley - The Young and the Restless - CBS
Damien Miller - Texas - ABC
Philip Tanzini - General Hospital - ABC

Best Young Actress in a Daytime Series
★ Becky Perle - The Kid Super Power Hour with Shazam! - NBC
Genie Francis - General Hospital - ABC
Dana Klaboe - Another World - NBC

Best Young Comedy Performer

Best Young Comedian: Motion Picture or Television
★ Scott Baio - Happy Days - ABC
Gary Coleman - Diff'rent Strokes - NBC
Peter Billingsley - Paternity - Paramount
Glenn Scarpelli - One Day at a Time  - CBS

Best Young Comedienne: Motion Picture or Television
★ Kim Fields - The Facts of Life - NBC
Mindy Cohn - The Facts of Life - NBC
Rori King - I'm a Big Girl Now - ABC
Nancy McKeon - The Facts of Life - NBC
Natasha Ryan - Ladies Man - CBS
Lisa Whelchel - The Facts of Life - NBC

Best Young Musical Recording Artist

Best Young Musical Recording Artist - Male
★ Lionel Richie - Endless Love - Mercury
Jim Photoglo - Fool in Love with You - 20th Century Fox
Russell Smith - Honky Tonk Freeway - Capitol

Best Young Musical Recording Artist - Female
★ Little Miss Piggy - The First Time It Happens - Atlantic
Stephanie Mills - Two Hearts - 20th Century Fox
Pia Zadora - Those Eyes - Curb Warner Records Corp.

Best Family Entertainment

Best Motion Picture - Family Enjoyment
★ Raiders of the Lost Ark - Paramount
Amy - Disney
Mommie Dearest - Paramount
Only When I Laugh - Columbia
The Earthling - Filmways

Best Motion Picture: Fantasy or Comedy - Family Enjoyment
★ Clash of the Titans - M.G.M.The Fox and the Hound - Disney
The Great Muppet Caper - Universal
The Incredible Shrinking Woman - Universal
Why Would I Lie? - M.G.M.

Best Television Special - Family Enjoyment
★ The Wave - T.A.T. Communications / ABCBroken Promises - CBS
Fallen Angel - CBS
Leave 'Em Laughing - CBS
A Step in Time - KCET
Twirl - NBC

Best Television Series - Family Enjoyment
★ Father Murphy - NBCDiff'rent Strokes - NBC
The Facts of Life - NBC
Little House on the Prairie - NBC
Happy Days - ABC

Best Children's Television Series
★ ABC Weekend Special: The Notorious Jumping Frog of Calaveras County'' - ABCCaptain Kangaroo - CBSThe Kid Super Power Hour with Shazam! - NBCSuperman and His Amazing Friends - NBC (possibly Super Friends - ABC)30 Minutes'' - CBS

Special Award

Former Great Child Star Award
★ Patsy Garrett

References

External links
Official site

Young Artist Awards ceremonies
1981 film awards
1981 television awards
1981 in American cinema
1981 in American television
1981 in California